Putina may refer to:

Putina (town), a town in Peru
Putina, a village in Vlădeşti Commune, Argeș County, Romania
Putina or Wawa Putina, a stratovolcano in Peru
Huaynaputina, a stratovolcano in Peru

See also
Putin (surname)